Ever may refer to:

 Ever (artist), creator of street art, from Buenos Aires, Argentina
 Ever, Kentucky
 -ever, an English suffix added to interrogative words in forms like wherever
 KT Tech EVER, a South Korean mobile phone manufacturer or its brand
 EveR South Korean android project

Music 
 Ever (Love Spirals Downwards album) (1996)
 Ever (IQ album) (1993)
 "Ever" (song), a 2010 song by Gackt
 "Ever" by Flipper from the album Album – Generic Flipper
 "Ever", a song by Diaura from the album Genesis
 "The Ever", a song by Red from the album Of Beauty and Rage

Literature 
 Ever (comics), a Marvel Comics character
 Ever, a book by Gail Carson Levine
 Ever (novella), a 2009 novella by Blake Butler

Organizations
 European Association for Vision and Eye Research, an international scientific society

People
 Ita Ever (born 1931), Estonian film, radio, theater and television actress
 Valter Ever (1902–1981), Estonian track and field athlete
 Éver Alfaro (born 1982), Costa Rican professional footballer
 Ever Hugo Almeida (born 1948), former football goalkeeper and now is the national coach of Guatemala
 Ever Amarilla (born 1984), Paraguayan footballer
 Ever Caballero (born 1982), Paraguayan footballer
 Ever Cantero (born 1985), Paraguayan footballer
 Ever Carradine (born 1974), American actress and the daughter of Robert Carradine
 Éver Guzmán (born 1988), Mexican football (soccer) player
 Ever Hernández (born 1958), retired football player from El Salvador
 Ever Magallanes (born 1965), former major league baseball player and all-star minor league player
 Ever Meulen (born 1946), Belgian illustrator and comic strip artist
 Ever Palacios (born 1969), Colombian football player
 Ever Salas (born 1983), Colombian Defender that plays for Carabobo FC of Venezuela

See also
 Eber (Standard Hebrew: ʿÉver), a character in the Bible